Franconia Township may refer to the following townships in the United States:

 Franconia Township, Chisago County, Minnesota
 Franconia Township, Montgomery County, Pennsylvania